Tanvi Vyas (born 30 September 1985) is an Indian actress who made her acting debut in the "Tamil" film Eppadi Manasukkul Vanthai in 2012. Prior to that, she was a graphic designer and later was crowned Femina Miss India Earth 2008 in Mumbai.

Biography
Born in Vadodara, the cultural capital of Gujarat, she belongs to a Hindu Brahmin family. She was born to Dr.J. K. Vyas and Vijaya Vyas. She is the only daughter of the doctor family. She did her schooling in the Convent of Jesus and Mary, Vadodara. She completed her Fine Arts, Graphic Design degree from Maharaja Sayajirao University of Baroda (Gujarati: મહારાજા સયાજીરાવ વિશ્વવિદ્યાલય; MSU) in 2009. While in college, she won Westside style showdown, a college based competition and participated in IIT Powai's cultural fest Mood Indigo.

Being a small town girl, with no background of any formal training, she went on to compete the country's most competitive beauty pageant, Femina Miss India, and was crowned Femina Miss India Earth 2008. She then went on to represent India at the Miss Earth 2008 pageant held at Manila, Philippines.

Modelling career
After winning the Miss India title in 2008, she went on to work as a show stopper with designers Ritu Kumar (Dubai fashion week, couture week), Neeta Lulla [Gitanjali Lifestyle Bridal couture], Digvijay Singh [Lakme India Fashion week], Krishna Mehta [Gitanjali Lifestyle],Lacone Hemant (Colombo).

She also made a few commercials both in the north and south of India for Air Wick, JP Cement, Colgate, Banjara Fairness, ClearTrip.com, Sri Laxmi jewellery, Kent Water Purifiers, Canvera Photo albums.

She has appeared in print commercials for Safi, Air India, Hero Cycles, Pantaloons, Donear with Vivek Oberoi, RMKV Silk Sarees.

Film career
Tanvi made her acting debut in Kollywood with the film Eppadi Manasukkul Vanthai ("How You Came Into My Heart"), a Tamil Indian film directed by P. V. Prasath.

Later she got the role of Swapna in Nenem…Chinna Pillana? under the prestigious banner of Padma Bhushan D. Ramanaidu.

Filmography

References

External links
 
 
 Miss India - Official website
 Miss India - Profile
 Tanvi Vyas at BollyGallery

Living people
Femina Miss India winners
Miss Earth 2008 contestants
People from Vadodara
Maharaja Sayajirao University of Baroda alumni
Actresses from Gujarat
Actresses in Tamil cinema
Actresses in Telugu cinema
Indian film actresses
21st-century Indian actresses
Gujarati people
1985 births
Miss Earth India delegates
Female models from Gujarat